Senecio bombayensis, commonly known as the sonki, is an annual plant of the genus Senecio and family Asteraceae.

References

External links

bombayensis
Flora of India (region)